Zhou Lianggong (1612–1672) was a Chinese poet, calligrapher, essayist, and art historian who was born in Kaifeng and had long family ties to Nanjing.

He passed his Jinshi degree in 1640, becoming a magistrate in Weixian, Shandong where he defended the city from attack from Manchu Qing army led by Abatai. He escaped to Beijing, but fled to Nanjing after the city was attacked by Li Zicheng's rebel forces. After Prince Dodo took Nanjing for the Qing dynasty, Zhou began serving the Qing. He would however take his place in the new Manchu regime in a variety of official capacities.  In 1655, he was accused of official corruption by the Governor General of Fujian and Zhejiang Tongtai and finally faced imprisonment in Fuzhou, where he edited his poetry collection Laigutang Ji. . He was in jail when Koxinga's forces attacked, and he was temporarily released to lead the defense. Zhou was eventually granted amnesty in 1661, Zhou again served as an official, acting as grain intendant of Nanjing. In December 1669 he hosts a party, and over twenty Nanjing-affiliated painters and poets gathered there. He was accused again of corruption in 1669. His sentence was hanging, but he was again given amnesty and released during the "General Amnesty" of 1670.

Late in life, he destroyed many of his writings, but not those of his many associates, whose work he guided and edited. Among his surviving works is a collection of jottings known as Yinshuwu Shuying, a work he compiled in prison, and a remarkable collection of letters, Chidu Xinchao. The collection of letters was a democratic undertaking. Many of the collected letters are by those who aided in the compilation. In a real sense, Zhou was chief editor. In the immediate years after his death, Zhou was considered a writer of the first rank. By the 18th century, he and other writers who had served two dynasties were then considered of a lower level. In the late 18th century, his works were considered anathema by the ruling monarch.

References

Kim, Hongnam., The Life of a Patron, China Institute, 1996. 
 
 Carpenter, Bruce E., ‘A Seventeenth-Century Chinese Anthology of Letters’, Tezukayama University Review (Tezukayama daigaku ronshū), Nara, Japan, 1990, no. 69,  pp. 176–190). 
 Carpenter, Bruce E., "Chou Liang-kung’s Shadows of Reading ", Tezukayama University Review (Tezukayama daigaku ronshū ), Nara, Japan, 1988, no. 62, pp. 35–43.
Wu, Zhengming, "Zhou Lianggong". Encyclopedia of China, 1st ed.

External links
Landscapes Clear and Radiant: The Art of Wang Hui (1632-1717), an exhibition catalog from The Metropolitan Museum of Art (fully available online as PDF), which contains material on Zhou Lianggong (see index)

1612 births
1672 deaths
Ming dynasty essayists
Ming dynasty poets
Writers from Kaifeng
Qing dynasty essayists
Qing dynasty calligraphers
Qing dynasty poets
Poets from Henan
Historians from Henan
Qing dynasty military personnel